Eric Berry Edney (1913–2000) was an English-born zoologist.

Edney was born in Bognor Regis, and moved to Rhodesia with his family as a child. He attended boarding school and a college in Bulawayo. Edney earned a bachelor's of science from Rhodes University College in 1933. He returned to England for graduate study, and was awarded a Diploma of Imperial College and Ph.D at the University of London in 1936. Edney worked for the National Museum of Southern Rhodesia until 1940, when he accepted a post as biology lecturer at Makerere College. During World War II, Edney served in the Uganda Defense Force. From 1946 to 1955, he severed concurrently as lecturer in zoology and reader in entomology at the University of Birmingham, while also earning his D.Sc from the same institution. Between 1955 and 1965, Edney taught at the University College of Rhodesia and Nyasaland, as founding leader of the department of zoology. He subsequently moved to the United States, teaching at the University of California, Riverside until 1972, and at the University of California, Los Angeles until 1979. In retirement, Edney moved to Vancouver, and assumed an honorary position at University of British Columbia. A diagnosis of macular degeneration ended his research career. Over the course of his career, Edney was awarded a Guggenheim Fellowship in 1968, and elected a fellow of the Royal Entomological Society, the Institute of Biology, and the American Association for the Advancement of Science. Edney died in Vancouver on 28 May 2000, aged 86.

References

1913 births
2000 deaths
People from Bognor Regis
Rhodesian scientists
British emigrants to Rhodesia
British emigrants to Canada
20th-century zoologists
English zoologists
Fellows of the American Association for the Advancement of Science
Academics of the University of Birmingham
Alumni of the University of Birmingham
Alumni of Imperial College London
Alumni of the University of London
Rhodes University alumni
Scientists from Vancouver
University of California, Riverside faculty
University of California, Los Angeles faculty
Fellows of the Royal Entomological Society
Fellows of the Royal Society of Biology
Academic staff of Makerere University